The men's Taijiquan / Taijijian all-round competition at the 2014 Asian Games in Incheon, South Korea was held on 23 September at the Ganghwa Dolmens Gymnasium.

Schedule
All times are Korea Standard Time (UTC+09:00)

Results

References

 Taijijian result
 Taijiquan result

Men's taijiquan